The 2021 Football Queensland season was the ninth season since NPL Queensland commenced as the top tier of Queensland men’s football. This season was also the fourth season of the Football Queensland Premier League and the inaugural season of the Football Queensland Premier League 2, representing the second and third tiers of Queensland men's football respectively. 

Below NPL Queensland and the FQPL was a regional structure of ten zones with their own leagues. The strongest of the zones was Football Brisbane with its senior men’s competition consisting of four divisions. The COVID-19 pandemic halted the season for a short period of time in all competitions, however all competitions in Queensland were completed.

National Premier Leagues Queensland 

The season was suspended between late July and late August due to the impacts from the COVID-19 pandemic in Australia. The NPL Premier normally qualifies for the national NPL finals series, but the 2021 National Premier Leagues finals series was cancelled.

Finals

Football Queensland Premier League

Finals

Football Queensland Premier League 2

Finals

Cup Competitions

FFA Cup Qualifiers
Queensland-based soccer clubs competed in 2021 in the preliminary rounds for the 2021 FFA Cup. The four winners of Seventh Round qualified for the final rounds of the FFA Cup; Edge Hill United representing Central and North Queensland, with Gold Coast Knights, Lions FC and Peninsula Power representing South East Queensland. In addition, A-League club Brisbane Roar qualified for the final rounds, entering at the Round of 32.

References 

Football Queensland seasons